Bachev may refer to:

 , or Bachiv, a village in Lviv Raion, Ukraine
Georgi Bachev (born 1977), Bulgarian footballer and manager
Mitko Bachev (born 1960), Bulgarian luger
Radoslav Bachev (born 1981), Bulgarian footballer
Stanislav Bachev (born 1981), Bulgarian footballer

Bulgarian-language surnames